Wine Enthusiast magazine is an American wine magazine published by Wine Enthusiast Companies in Valhalla, New York. Founded in 1979 by Adam and Sybil Strum, Wine Enthusiast Companies engages in the wine accessories, storage, information, education, events and travel markets.

Wine Enthusiast was founded in 1988, offering information on wine and spirits, with reviews and articles on topics peripheral to wine, such as entertaining, travel, restaurants and notable sommeliers. Published 14 times a year, the magazine has a readership of 800,000 consumers worldwide. The magazine's website hosts a database of wine reviews, interviews food and wine pairings, beer and spirits news, and other topics.

The magazine's executive editor is Susan Kostrzewa, and the managing editor is Lauren Buzzeo.

In addition to print and online publication, Wine Enthusiast hosts events for consumers and trade. Two main annual events are the Top 100 Wine Restaurant event, which celebrates the top 100 wine restaurants in the United States featured yearly in the August Issue, the annual Wine Star Awards dinner, during which awards are given to recipients in ten major industry categories. 

In June 2021, Wine Enthusiast Companies named the new presidents of the magazine, Erika and Jacqueline Strum. Erika Strum serves as President of Wine Enthusiast Commerce and Jacqueline Strum serves as President & Publisher of Wine Enthusiast Media.

See also
 List of food and drink magazines

References

External links
 Wine Enthusiast Magazine official site 

1988 establishments in New York (state)
Lifestyle magazines published in the United States
Magazines established in 1988
Magazines published in New York (state)
Mount Pleasant, New York
Wine magazines